The Cayman Islands National Museum is a museum in the Cayman Islands.  It is housed in the former Old Courts Building on Harbor Drive in George Town, Grand Cayman. The museum is dedicated to the preservation, research and display of all aspects of Caymanian heritage.

Opened in 1990, the museum's beginnings can be traced to the 1930s when local resident Ira Thompson began collecting Caymanian artifacts as a hobby; in 1979, the government purchased Thompson's collection and it now encompasses a major portion of the museum's collection.  The museum contains over 8,000 items and artifacts ranging from coins to a 14-foot catboat. The Natural History Exhibit features a 3-dimensional map depicting the underwater geological formations that surround the Cayman Islands.

Margaret Leshikar-Denton was appointed the museum's director in 2011, having first worked for the museum in 1986.

References

External links
Cayman Islands National Museum website

Museums in the Cayman Islands
Museums established in 1990
National museums
1990 establishments in the Cayman Islands
Buildings and structures in George Town, Cayman Islands